Compsocerocoris is a genus of grass bugs (insects in the family Miridae).

References

External links 

 

Miridae genera